The 2006 Australian Production Car Championship was a CAMS sanctioned motor racing title for drivers of Group 3E Series Production Cars. The championship, which was administered by the Production Car Association of Australia, was the 13th Australian Production Car Championship.

Calendar
The title was contested over a seven-round series with three races per round.
 Round 1, Wakefield Park Raceway, New South Wales, 4 & 5 March
 Round 2, Symmons Plains International Raceway, Tasmania, 8 & 9 April
 Round 3, Oran Park Raceway, New South Wales, 6 & 7 May
 Round 4, Eastern Creek International Raceway, New South Wales, 8 & 9 July
 Round 5, Phillip Island Grand Prix Circuit, Victoria, 19 & 20 August
 Round 6, Queensland Raceway, Ipswich, Queensland, 3 September
 Round 7, Oran Park Raceway, New South Wales, 28 & 29 October
Race 1 at each round employed a massed start with Races 2 & 3 each utilising a handicap start.

Class Structure
Cars competed in three classes, designated A, B & C, as per the published Vehicle Eligibility Schedule. Additional entries competed in the Trophy Class, these being cars with a record of competition in the championship, but not included on the 2006 eligibility list. Drivers of Trophy Class cars were not eligible to score championship points.

Points system
Outright championship points were allocated on a 30-25-22-20-18-16-14-12-10-8-6-4-2-1 basis for the first 14 finishers in each handicap race. One point was awarded to all other finishers in these races.

Points towards the three class awards were allocated on a 30-25-22-20-18-16-14-12-10-8-6-4-2-1 basis to the first 14 finishers in each class in each race. One point was awarded to each of the other finishers in each race and three points were awarded to the fastest driver in each Class in qualifying at each round.

Results

References

External links
 Production Car Association of Australia website - as captured at web.archive.org on 24 August 2010 - includes image galleries

Australian Production Car Championship
Production Car Championship